Bullfrog Power, an Envest company, is a Canadian green energy retailer operating in Canada. Bullfrog offers green electricity from renewable energy sources such as wind, solar, and low-impact hydro, as well as green fuel and green natural gas, a renewable biogas product that serves as an alternative to fossil fuel-based natural gas. Bullfrog only sources electricity from generation sources that meet or exceed the federal government's Environmental Choice Program EcoLogo standard for renewable electricity. Bullfrog's green natural gas product is produced at facilities that have met environmental standards as defined by ICF International.

Across Canada, Bullfrog's electricity comes exclusively from wind, solar, and low-impact hydro facilities.

Less Emission is a subsidiary of Bullfrog "that works to limit the environmental impact of air travel–an important service for festivals and conferences across Canada."

Operation

Bullfrog Power does not inject the green electricity, green natural gas, or green fuel directly into a customer's home or facility, as doing so would require building parallel energy distribution systems, which are observed to be neither environmentally nor financially sound.

Instead, Bullfrog ensures that the electricity being put onto the grid on its customers' behalf is from renewable sources. For every MWh of clean, renewable electricity that is produced and injected onto the grid by a green power generator, a corresponding Green Electricity Certificate (GEC) is created to represent the positive environmental benefits (such as emissions reductions) associated with producing that green power.

Bullfrog uses a customer's premium to secure and retire Green Electricity Certificates from wind, solar, or low-impact hydro generators on the customer's behalf. This entitles the customer to claim the green energy and associated emissions reductions.

Similar to the way its green electricity offering works, Bullfrog secures and retires Green Natural Gas Certificates on behalf of customers, enabling customers to claim the green energy and associated environmental benefits.

Bullfrog Power's sister company, Less Emissions Inc., provides CDM Gold Standard and VER+ Standard-certified carbon offsets.

Customers and supporters

Bullfrog Power currently has more than 8,000 residential customers and more than 1,300 commercial customers. Well-known residential customers include Kristina Groves, Thomas Homer-Dixon, and Nino Ricci. Notable bullfrogpowered organizations include Unilever Canada, AutoShare, and Lake Ontario Waterkeeper.

A number of environmental organizations support Bullfrog Power's renewable energy, such as WWF-Canada, the David Suzuki Foundation and the Pembina Institute.

Transparency

Bullfrog Power is audited on an annual basis to confirm that as much green electricity, natural gas, and fuel has been injected onto the system as its customers have used, and that it has retired all emissions credits related to customer contracts.

Bullfrog pioneered the concept of an annual audit for green electricity retailers when it launched in 2005.

B Corporation status

In 2011, Bullfrog Power announced its certification as one of Canada's founding B Corporations by B Lab. Certified B Corporations meet higher standards of social and environmental performance, transparency, and accountability. Unlike traditional corporations, Certified B Corporations are legally required to consider the impact of their decisions on their employees, suppliers, community, consumers, and the environment.

In 2012, Bullfrog Power was named to B Corporation's "Best for the World" list under the category "Best for the Environment."

In 2013, Bullfrog Power was once again named to B Corporation's "Best for the World" list, this time under the category "Best for Environmental Impact."

In 2018, Bullfrog Power was recognized in the Environment, Workers, and Governance categories.

References

External links
 Bullfrog Power
 Pembina, WWF-Canada & David Suzuki Foundation endorsement quotations on Bullfrog Power homepage.
 Less Emissions

Renewable energy companies of Canada
Energy in Ontario
Companies based in Toronto
Canadian companies established in 2005
Energy companies established in 2005
Renewable resource companies established in 2005
Benefit corporations